An adaptation is a transfer of a work of art from one style, culture or medium to another.

Some common examples are:
 Film adaptation, a story from another work, adapted into a film (it may be a novel, non-fiction like journalism, autobiography, comic books, scriptures, plays or historical sources).
 Literary adaptation, a story from a literary source, adapted into another work. A novelization is a story from another work, adapted into a novel.
 Theatrical adaptation, a story from another work, adapted into a play.

Types of adaptation 
There is no end to potential media involved in adaptation. Adaptation might be seen as a special case of intertextuality or intermediality, which involves the practice of transcoding (changing the code or 'language' used in a medium) as well as the assimilation of a work of art to other cultural, linguistic, semiotic, aesthetic or other norms. Recent approaches to the expanding field of adaptation studies reflect these expansions of our perspective. Adaptation occurs as a special case of intertextual and intermedial exchange and the copy-paste culture of digital technologies has produced "new intertextual forms engendered by emerging technologies—mashups, remixes, reboots, samplings, remodelings, transformations— " that "further develop the impulse to adapt and appropriate, and the ways in which they challenge the theory and practice of adaptation and appropriation."

History of adaptation 
The practice of adaptation was common in ancient Greek culture, for instance in adapting myths and narratives for the stage (Aeschylus, Sophocles' and Euripides' adaptations of Homer). William Shakespeare was an arch adaptor, as nearly all of his plays are heavily dependent on pre-existing sources. Prior to Romantic notions of originality, copying classic authors was seen as a key aesthetic practice in Western culture. This neoclassical paradigm was expressed by Alexander Pope who equated the copying of Homer with copying nature in An Essay on Criticism:

"And but from Nature's fountains scorned to draw;
But when to examine every part he came,
Nature and Homer were, he found, the same.
Convinced, amazed, he checks the bold design,
And rules as strict his labored work confine
As if the Stagirite o'erlooked each line.
Learn hence for ancient rules a just esteem;
To copy Nature is to copy them."

According to Pope in An Essay on Criticism, the task of a writer was to vary existing ideas: "What oft was thought, but ne'er so well expressed;". In the 19th century, many European nations sought to re-discover and adapt medieval narratives that might be harnessed to various kinds of nationalist causes.

See also 
 Appropriation (art)
 Intermedia
 Intertextuality
 Remediation
 Remix culture
 Transmedia storytelling

References

Further reading 
 Cardwell, Sarah. 'Adaptation Revisited: Television and the Classic Novel'. Manchester: MUP, 2021.
 Cutchins, Dennis, Katja Krebs, Eckart Voigts (eds.). The Routledge Companion to Adaptation. London: Routledge, 2018.
 Elliott, Kamilla. Theorizing Adaptation. Oxford: OUP, 2020.
 Hutcheon, Linda, with Siobhan O'Flynn. A Theory of Adaptation. 2nd ed. London: Routledge, 2013.
 Leitch, Thomas (ed.) Oxford Handbook of Adaptation Studies. Oxford: OUP, 2017.
 Murray, Simone. The Adaptation Industry: The Cultural Economy of Contemporary Adaptation. New York: Routledge, 2012.
 Sanders, Julie. Adaptation and Appropriation. London: Routledge, 2006.

The arts